Dragons, or worms, are present in Germanic mythology and wider folklore, where they are often portrayed as large venomous serpents. Especially in later tales, however, they share many common features with other dragons in European mythology.

Origin, appearance and terminology 
In early depictions, as with dragons in other cultures, the distinction between Germanic dragons and regular snakes is blurred, with both being referred to as Old Norse  or Old English  from Proto-Germanic *wurmiz. Wyrm has since been borrowed back into modern English to mean "dragon", while the descendent term worm remains used in modern English to refer to dragons, especially those lacking wings.

Old Norse  and Old English  mean "dragon, sea serpent or sea monster" and are in turn derived from Proto-Germanic *drakō, an early borrowing from Latin draco "huge serpent or dragon".

The evolution of wingless and legless worms and lindworms to flying, four-legged romanesque dragons in Germanic folklore and literature is most likely due to influence from continental Europe that was facilitated by Christianisation and the increased availability of translated romances. It has thus been proposed that the description in Völuspá of Níðhöggr with feathers and flying after Ragnarök is a late addition and potentially a result of the integration of pagan and Christian imagery.

To address the difficulties with categorising Germanic dragons, the term drakorm has been proposed, referring to beings described as either a dreki or ormr.

List of Germanic dragons 

  is a dragon attested in the Eddas that gnaws at the roots of Yggdrasil and the corpses of Náströnd.
 , also known as the Midgard Serpent, is described as a giant, venomous beast and the child of Loki and Angrboða.
  is a widely attested dragon that has a prominent role in the  Cycle. Fafnir took the form of a dragon after claiming a hoard of treasure, including Andvaranaut, from his father. He was later killed by Sigurd (Sigfried) who hid in a pit and stabbed him from underneath with a sword.
 The  contains a description of a dragon killed by Frotho I.  The dragon is described as "the keeper of the mountain." After Frotho I kills the dragon, he takes its hoard of treasure. The Gesta Danorum describes another dragon fight where a dragon is slain by Friðleifr and it is similar to the story of Frotho I.

There are several sagas with dragons in them, including Þiðreks saga, Övarr-Odds saga, and Sigrgarðs saga frækna, among others.

Common traits

Guarding treasure

The association between dragons and hoards of treasure is widespread in Germanic literature.

In the Völsung Cycle,  was a dwarf who, upon claiming a hoard of treasure, including the ring Andvaranaut, transforms into a dragon. Fáfnir's brother, Regin reforges the sword Gram from broken shards and gives it to the hero Sigurd who uses it to kill the dragon by waiting in a hole until the worm slithers over and exposes his underbelly. While dying Fáfnir speaks with Sigurd and shares mythological knowledge. Sigurd then cooks and tastes the dragon's heart, allowing the hero to understand the speech of birds who tell him to kill Regin, which he does and then takes the hoard for himself. In Beowulf, it is Sigmund (the father of Sigurd in Old Norse tradition) who kills a dragon and takes its hoard.

In Beowulf, the dragon that the poem's eponymous hero is awoken from the burial mound in which it dwells when a cup from its hoard is stolen, leading it to seek vengeance from the Geats. After both the dragon and Beowulf die, the treasure is reinterred in the king's barrow. The Old English poem, Maxims II further states:

In Ragnars saga loðbrókar, Thóra, the daughter of a Geatish earl, is given a snake by her father which she puts on top of a pile of gold. This makes both the snake and the treasure grow until the dragon is so large its head touches its tail. The image of an encircled snake eating its own tail is also seen with Jörmungandr. The hero Ragnar Lodbrok later wins the hand of Thóra and the treasure by slaying the dragon. The motif of gold causing a snake-like creature to grow into a dragon is seen in the Icelandic tale of the Lagarfljót Worm recorded in the 19th century.

Breathing fire and poison
Dragons with poisonous breath are believed to predate those who breathe fire in Germanic folklore and literature, consistent with the theory that Germanic dragons developed from traditions regarding wild snakes, some of whom produce venom. The Nine Herbs Charm describes nine plants being used to overcome the venom of a slithering .

In Eddic poetry, both  and  the sea serpent  are described as having poisonous breath. In Gylfaginning it is told that during Ragnarök, Thor will kill Jörmungandr however after taking nine steps, he will be in turn killed by the worm's venom. A similar creature from Orcadian folklore is the poisonous stoor worm which was killed by the hero Assipattle, falling into the sea and forming Iceland, Orkney, Shetland and the Faroe Islands. As in the English tale of the Linton worm, the stoor worm is killed by burning its insides with peat.

Beowulf is one of the earliest examples of a fire-breathing dragon yet it is also referred to as "the poison scourge". After burning homes and land in Geatland, it fights the eponymous hero of the poem who bears a metal shield to protect himself from the fire. The dragon wounds him but is slain by the king's thane Wiglaf. Beowulf later succumbs to the dragon's poison and dies. The other dragon mentioned in the poem is further associated with fire, melting from its own heat once slain by Sigmund. Both fire and venom are also spat by dragons in the Chivalric saga Sigurðr saga þögla and in Nikolaus saga erkibiskups II, written around 1340 AD, in which the dragon is sent by God to teach an English deacon to become more pious.

Material culture

Carved dragon heads 
Drakkar were ships used by Vikings in the Medieval period that featured carved prows in the shape of dragons. One version of the Icelandic Landnámabók states that the ancient Heathen law of Iceland required any ship having a dragon figurehead in place on one's ship "with gaping mouth or yawning snout"  to remove the carving before coming in sight of land because it would frighten the landvættir.

Stave churches are sometimes decorated by carved dragon heads which has been proposed to have originated in the belief in their apotropaic function.

Depictions of entire dragons
Medieval depictions of worms carved in stone feature both in Sweden and the British Isles. In Sweden, runic inscriptions dated to around the 11th century often show a lindworm bearing the text encircling the remaining picture on the stone. Some Sigurd stones such as U 1163, Sö 101 (the Rasmund carving) and Sö 327 (the Gök inscription) show a Sigurd thrusting a sword through the worm which is identified as Fáfnir. The killing of Fáfnir is also potentially pictured on four crosses from the Isle of Man and a now lost fragment, with a similar artistic style, from the church at Kirby Hill in England.

Wooden carvings from the Hylestad Stave Church of scenes from the Völsunga saga include Sigurd killing Fáfnir, who is notably shown with two legs and two wings.

The fishing trip described in Hymiskviða in which Thor catches  has been linked to a number of stones in Scandinavia and England such as the Altuna Runestone and the Hørdum stone.

See also
 Hyrrokkin, a gýgr in Norse mythology who uses snakes as reins
 Ormhäxan, a picture stone from Gotland depicting a woman with snakes

Citations

References

Primary

Secondary

 
 
 
 
 
 
 
 
 
 
 
 

Germanic folklore
Germanic legendary creatures
Creatures in Norse mythology
European dragons